Lance W. Clow (born December 12, 1947, in Los Angeles, California) is a Republican Idaho State Representative since 2012 representing District 24 in the A seat.

Education
Clow earned his BA in economics from California Lutheran University, Graduate Work in accounting and finance from California State University, Northridge, and in business administration from Idaho State University.

Elections

References

External links
Lance Clow at the Idaho Legislature
 

1947 births
Living people
California Lutheran University alumni
California State University, Northridge alumni
Idaho State University alumni
Mayors of places in Idaho
Republican Party members of the Idaho House of Representatives
People from Los Angeles
People from Twin Falls, Idaho
21st-century American politicians